Amanda Schull is an American actress and former professional ballet dancer. She is known for her lead role in the 2000 film Center Stage, and for her recurring roles on the American television series One Tree Hill and Pretty Little Liars. She starred in the Syfy television series 12 Monkeys, and played a recurring role on the USA television series Suits before being promoted to series regular for the show's eighth and ninth seasons.

Early life
Schull was born in Honolulu, Hawaii, the daughter of Susan Schull, the current president of Ballet Hawaii, and is one of three children. She attended Punahou School, and trained at Hawaii State Ballet under the instruction of John Landovsky.

Schull was offered a scholarship to Indiana University for ballet, and attended at age 17. While at Indiana University, she joined Delta Delta Delta. During her sophomore year (as a ballet and journalism major), she attended the San Francisco Ballet School Summer Intensive. She continued her studies for an additional year on scholarship.

After Schull's year-long scholarship ended in 1999, she continued as an apprentice. After filming Center Stage, she subsequently joined SFB as a full-time member of its corps de ballet.

Career
Schull was cast in the starring role of Jody Sawyer in the 2000 film Center Stage while still an apprentice with the San Francisco Ballet.

In April 2006, Schull retired from San Francisco Ballet. In May 2008 she went to Australia to film the movie adaptation of Li Cunxin's Mao's Last Dancer. In Mao's Last Dancer, released in North America in 2010, Schull has a major role as Elizabeth "Liz" Mackey, the girlfriend (and later, first wife) of Li Cunxin.

In 2009, Schull had a guest star role on the Fox TV show, Lie to Me (season 1, episode 4). The same year, she was seen in the Lifetime Movie Sorority Wars starring Lucy Hale and Courtney Thorne-Smith. She also guest starred on The CW's One Tree Hill as Sara, the spirit and memory of the deceased wife of Clay (played by Robert Buckley), and also as Clay's wannabe lover who bears a striking resemblance to Sara—Katie Ryan. She guest starred in an episode of Ghost Whisperer (Greek Tragedy) in 2009, and episode 14 of Bones, in 2010. Schull recurringly appeared as Meredith, who is Aria's (Lucy Hale's character) dad's former lover, in the ABC Family series Pretty Little Liars. She also appeared in an episode of Hawaii Five-0. In March 2012, she appeared in a McDonald's commercial for the Shamrock Shake and in April she guest starred in an episode of Psych. Also in 2012 she appeared in an episode of Grimm as Lucinda, a character who resembles Cinderella, but with a twist. In February 2013 she appeared as Agent Naomi in an episode of Nikita (Black Badge). Since 2013, Schull has appeared in the recurring role of Katrina Bennett in USA Network's Suits. In March 2018, she was promoted to series regular for the eighth season of Suits.

In November 2013, Schull was cast as Cassandra Railly on the television series 12 Monkeys, based on the 1995 film of the same name. The show premiered January 16, 2015.

Personal life
Schull met her husband, George Wilson, while filming Mao's Last Dancer in Australia. In February 2020, Schull gave birth to the couple's first child, a son.

Filmography

References

External links

 
 

Living people
21st-century American actresses
American ballerinas
American film actresses
American television actresses
Indiana University alumni
Actresses from Honolulu
Punahou School alumni
Dancers from Hawaii
San Francisco Ballet dancers
Year of birth missing (living people)